Larisa Cerić (born 26 January 1991) is a Bosnian judoka competing in the women's +78 kg division. She won a silver medal at the 2014 European Judo Championships and a bronze medal at the 2018 World Judo Championships. 

At the 2019 European Games Cerić won a silver medal, only ever European Games medal for her country. She also won a gold medal at World Judo Juniors Championships in 2009, which is still the only world title in any Olympic sport for Bosnia and Herzegovina.

Cerić competed at the 2016 Summer Olympics and 2020 Summer Olympics, losing both times in the second round of the competition. At the 2020 Summer Olympics she was one of the flag bearers along with Amel Tuka.

She holds notable wins over Olympic medalists Emilie Andeol (gold), Iryna Kindzerska (bronze), Yu Song (bronze), Kanae Yamabe (bronze) and Lucija Polavder (bronze).

Cerić is among five competitors with the most European Judo Championships medals in +78 category (4) since it was introduced in 1998, placing behind Karina Bryant (8), Tea Donguzashvili (8), Lucija Polavder (7) and Anne-Sophie Mondiere (5).

In 2018, in +78 kg category for seniors, she achieved World No. 1 ranking.

She won one of the bronze medals in the women's +78 kg event at the 2022 Mediterranean Games held in Oran, Algeria.

Achievements and awards

Awards
Bosnia and Herzegovina Sportsperson of the Year (7 times): 2009, 2010, 2013, 2014, 2017, 2018, 2019
Olympic Committee of Bosnia and Herzegovina Sportsperson of the Year (4 times): 2012, 2014, 2017, 2018 
Sixth April Award of Sarajevo

References

External links

 
 
 

1991 births
Living people
People from Travnik
Bosnia and Herzegovina female judoka
Judoka at the 2016 Summer Olympics
Judoka at the 2020 Summer Olympics
Olympic judoka of Bosnia and Herzegovina
Mediterranean Games silver medalists for Bosnia and Herzegovina
Mediterranean Games bronze medalists for Bosnia and Herzegovina
Mediterranean Games medalists in judo
Competitors at the 2009 Mediterranean Games
Competitors at the 2013 Mediterranean Games
Competitors at the 2022 Mediterranean Games
Judoka at the 2015 European Games
Judoka at the 2019 European Games
European Games medalists in judo
European Games silver medalists for Bosnia and Herzegovina